Wychavon District Council elections are held every four years. Wychavon District Council is the local authority for the non-metropolitan district of Wychavon in Worcestershire, England. Since the last boundary changes in 2003, 45 councillors have been elected from 32 wards.

Political control
The first election to the council was held in 1973, initially operating as a shadow authority until it came into its powers on 1 April 1974. Political control of the council since 1974 has been held by the following parties:

Leadership
The leaders of the council since 1999 have been:

Council elections
Summary of the results of recent council elections, click on the year for full details of each election. Boundary changes took place for the 2003 election reducing the number of seats by four.

1973 Wychavon District Council election
1976 Wychavon District Council election
1979 Wychavon District Council election (New ward boundaries)
1983 Wychavon District Council election
1987 Wychavon District Council election (Some new ward boundaries & district boundary changes also took place)

District result maps

By-election results
By-elections occur when seats become vacant between council elections. Below is a summary of recent by-elections; full by-election results can be found by clicking on the by-election name.

References

External links
Wychavon District Council

 
Council elections in Worcestershire
District council elections in England
Council elections in Hereford and Worcester